The inflaton field is a hypothetical scalar field which is conjectured to have driven cosmic inflation in the very early universe.
The field, originally postulated by Alan Guth, provides a mechanism by which a period of rapid expansion from 10−35 to 10−34 seconds after the initial expansion can be generated, forming a universe consistent with observed spatial isotropy and homogeneity.

Cosmological inflation

The basic model of inflation proceeds in three phases:

 Expanding vacuum state with high potential energy
 Phase transition to true vacuum
 Slow roll and reheating

Expanding vacuum state with high potential energy

In quantum field theory, a vacuum state or vacuum is a state of quantum fields which is at locally minimal potential energy. Quantum particles are excitations which deviate from this minimal potential energy state, therefore a vacuum state has no particles in it. Depending on the specifics of a quantum field theory, it can have more than one vacuum state. Different vacua, despite all "being empty" (having no particles), will generally have different vacuum energy. Quantum field theory stipulates that the pressure of the vacuum energy is always negative and equal in magnitude to its energy density.

Inflationary theory postulates that there is a vacuum state with very large vacuum energy, caused by a non-zero vacuum expectation value of the inflaton field. Any region of space in this state will rapidly expand. Even if initially it is not empty (contains some particles), very rapid exponential expansion dilutes particle density to essentially zero.

Phase transition to true vacuum

Inflationary theory further postulates that this "inflationary vacuum" state is not the state with globally lowest energy; rather, it is a "false vacuum", also known as a metastable state.

For each observer at any chosen point of space, the false vacuum eventually tunnels into a state with the same potential energy, but which is not a vacuum (it is not at a local minimum of the potential energy—it can "decay"). This state can be seen as a true vacuum, filled with a large number of inflaton particles. However, the rate of expansion of the true vacuum does not change at that moment: Only its exponential character changes to much slower expansion of the FLRW metric. This ensures that expansion rate precisely matches the energy density.

Slow roll and reheating

In the true vacuum, inflaton particles decay, eventually giving rise to the observed Standard Model particles. The shape of the potential energy function near "tunnel exit" from false vacuum state must have a shallow slope, otherwise particle production will be confined to the boundary of expanding true vacuum bubble, which contradicts observation (our Universe is not built of huge completely void bubbles). In other words, the quantum state should "roll to the bottom slowly".

When complete, the decay of inflaton particles fills the space with hot and dense Big Bang plasma.

Field quanta
Just like every other quantum field, excitations of the inflaton field are expected to be quantized. The field quanta of the inflaton field are known as inflatons. Depending on the modeled potential energy density, the inflaton field's ground state might, or might not, be zero.

The term inflaton follows the typical style of other quantum particles’ names – such as photon, gluon, boson, and fermion – deriving from the word inflation. The term was first used in a paper by Nanopoulos, Olive, and Srednicki (1983).
The nature of the inflaton field is currently not known. One of the obstacles for narrowing its properties down is that current quantum theory is not able to correctly predict the observed vacuum energy, based on the particle content of a chosen theory (see vacuum catastrophe).

Atkins (2012) suggested that it is possible that no new field is necessary – that a modified version of the Higgs field could function as an inflaton.

Non-minimally coupled inflation
Non-minimally coupled inflation is an inflationary model in which the constant which couples gravity to the inflaton field is not small.

,

See also

References

Inflation (cosmology)
Hypothetical particles
Dark energy